Frontier Medical College (FMC) (Urdu, Pashto,) is medical teaching institution and one of several medical schools affiliated to Bahria University. Located in Abbottabad of the Khyber-Pakhtunkhwa province in Pakistan.The college grants the degrees Bachelor of Medicine and Surgery (MBBS) after completion of 5 years of medical training. Besides that, there are nursing and several para-medical courses. FMC has approximately 700 students in the MBBS and BDS programs.

History
Frontier Medical College was founded in 1995 as the first private medical institute in Khyber-Pakhtunkhwa and second private medical school in Pakistan. Frontier Medical College and its teaching hospital are self-financing institutions sponsored by a Board of Directors. It was established in 1995 on about 200 Kanals of land at the foothills of a pine forest in the rural outskirts of Abbottabad on the main Karakoram Highway leading from Islamabad to the Chinese border and on to the Central Asian States. It is housed in purpose-built buildings. The 500-bed Shahina Jamil Hospital has been built at the college premises adjacent to the college. In addition to medical students, nurses and paramedical are also trained. Under an agreement of private-cum public partnership with the government of Khyber-Pakhtunkhwa the 360-bed Government DHQ Teaching Hospital Mansehra is used for teaching and training of medical students.

College buildings

The main college building is a four-storey purpose-built complex with over 110,000 square feet of covered area. It accommodates all the departments including lecture halls, laboratories, dissection hall, library, museum, computer laboratory, a 500-seat auditorium, seminar rooms, college staff and students room and offices. There is another single-storey building housing the Community Medicine Department.

Hospitals

The college has two teaching hospitals. One is its own teaching hospital on the college premises called Shahina Jamil Hospital. It is a new 350-bed general hospital. It is staffed by doctors, nurses and paramedical staff. It provides clinical training to the senior medical students, and medical care facilities to all deserving patients free of cost. The students of the dental section are also trained here.

The second hospital is the government King Abdullah Teaching Hospital at Mansehra. It is a very busy general hospital with 360 beds. It has been acquired from the Khyber-Pakhtunkhwa government for teaching and training of medical students. The college had constructed in collaboration with the government of Khyber-Pakhtunkhwa a new 136-bed block called "Frontier Medical College Block" in the hospital.

Hostels
Hostels are separated by gender. For female students who are not living with their parents, residing in a college hostel is mandatory. Each hostel is staffed with wardens, cooks, bearers, chowkidars and cleaners. Along with the aforementioned, female hostels have additional housekeepers, washerwomen, and special security guards.

Transport
The college transport system consists of buses, coasters and vans. They are used to transport students to the college from hostels and also to the teaching hospital at Mansehra, Basic Health Units (BHU), Rural Health Centers (RHC), and to the rural areas to conduct medical camps.

Education
The medical education at FMC is a five-year curriculum leading to the MBBS degree, the equivalent of the basic M.D degree in the United States, Europe, and the Middle East.  The curriculum covers basic and clinical medical sciences. Students learn in a small-class environment as opposed to a large class environment so that ideally they will have more interaction time with their professors. In conjunction with the curriculum, students are encouraged to engage in research to refine their skills as well as to gain the most from their education. Guest speakers such as medical personalities, scientists, literary persons and military officers are invited on a weekly basis to give lectures to expose students to fields of work in the medical profession. Medical camps are held regularly so that students may travel to rural areas within a 50-kilometre radius to gather information and offer guidance to the community. These medical camps provide an extensive amount of social interaction which prepare students for clinical training.

Administration
Frontier Medical College is sponsored by Al-Jamil Trust and administered by a Board of Governors that is composed of a wide variety of delegates such as Al-Jamil Trust representatives, public representatives, government officials, distinguished citizens, and leading members of the medical profession. Prof. Dr. Abdul Jamil Khan, the president of the PMDC as well as the principal of two other medical colleges (Bolan Medical College and Ayub Medical College) is the founding principal. Prof. Dr. Abdul Jamil Khan also has had many other positions of authority. Prof. Dr. Mujahid Akbar, a member of the PMDC and head of the Department of Anatomy holds the position of dean. Vice-deans include: Prof. Dr. M.A. Khaliq, Prof. Dr. Gul Mohammad, Prof. Dr. Afzal Haq Asif and Brig ® Prof. Dr. Muzaffar Khan.

Admission
Applicants who pass the F. Sc (Pre-Medical) Examination or a foreign equivalent with marks of at least 60% are eligible for admission. Admission is not restricted to any gender, nationality or religious affiliation. An aptitude test to gauge knowledge in English, Biology, Chemistry, and Physics is administered to applicants who meet the academic requirement. Out of the group of applicants, only the top 120 are invited to an interview to further assess the candidate. Candidates are then selected on merit, based on their entry test marks, F.Sc marks, aptitude entry and interview marks.

Collaboration
Frontier Medical College has formed a partnership with Xinjiang Medical University and the University of Calgary. Through the partnership, professors and students are exchanged and allowed to work together on research as well as learn with one another. The Xinjiang Medical University will provide a Chinese Traditional Medical Centre at Frontier Medical College, the first of its kind in Pakistan.

Sports
There are sports facilities at the college campus for volleyball, basketball, badminton and tennis. Hostels are provided with table tennis facilities and other indoor games. Facilities for indoor badminton and table tennis are provided in the college auditorium which is used as a gymnasium in winter months and during snow and rains. For games like football, hockey and cricket facilities available in Abbottabad are used. Skiing facilities are available during the winter months at Kalabagh, 45 minutes away in the mountains.

Student societies
 Debating Society
 Dramatic and Cultural Society
 Literary Society
 Patient Welfare Society
 Blood Donation Society
 Environment Protection Society
 Frontier Medical College Welfare Society
 Sport Club
 Students Health Care Society
 Pharmacology Society
 Fine Arts Society
 FMC old students Society

Medical facilities
Health care in the college teaching hospitals is free to all students.

If a student falls ill with a minor ailment, they are provided with treatment in the outpatient's department. If it is a serious illness or requires hospital admission, treatment is arranged and the cost of the treatment, which is nominal, is paid by the student or by the health insurance company if they are insured.

If any student or their parents desire health insurance cover, it is available through the New Jubilee Insurance Company at a nominal premium.

FMC graduates
The first 20 batches of students admitted have passed their Final Professional MBBS examination of Bahria University Islamabad securing MBBS degrees. They have been registered with the PMDC and are working in government teaching hospitals and other hospitals in the country and abroad. Many of them have passed PLAB, USMLE and FCPS examinations.

Notable past and present faculty and alumni
(please only add notable names of people with already existing Wikipedia articles) 
 Abdul Jamil Khan(Sitara-e-Imtiaz) –  DCH, MRCP, FRCP Renowned Medical specialist founding principal Ayub Teaching Hospital, Federal Minister for Population welfare, Govt of Pakistan
 Dr. Masuma Anwar - pediatric doctor, singer-songwriter and musician.

References

External links
 

Medical colleges in Khyber Pakhtunkhwa
Educational institutions established in 1995
Academic institutions in Pakistan
1995 establishments in Pakistan